Orits Wiliki is a Nigerian reggae musician who gained recognition upon the success of his 1989 record, Tribulation produced in part by Lemmy Jackson. The record was followed by Conqueror, released in 1990, and in 1991, he released a less successful LP Wha Dis Wha Dat. The album included the single, Heart of Stone which included an Islamic chant, an addition by Wiliki, a Christian to promote religious tolerance. The influence of religion was eminent in some of his songs so also was disenchantment with the Nigerian society. 

Wiliki is a member of the Musical Copyright Society of Nigeria, a rival association to the Copyright Society of Nigeria.

Discography 
 Tribulation. 1989. Polydor Records
 Conqueror. 1990. Polydor Records
 Wha Dis Wha Dat. 1991. Premier Music.

References

Nigerian reggae musicians
Possibly living people
Year of birth missing